This is a list of the mammal species recorded in Vanuatu. There are 22 mammal species in Vanuatu, of which one is endangered and four are vulnerable.

The following tags are used to highlight each species' conservation status as assessed by the International Union for Conservation of Nature:

Some species were assessed using an earlier set of criteria. Species assessed using this system have the following instead of near threatened and least concern categories:

Order: Sirenia (manatees and dugongs) 

Sirenia is an order of fully aquatic, herbivorous mammals that inhabit rivers, estuaries, coastal marine waters, swamps, and marine wetlands. All four species are endangered.

Family: Dugongidae
Genus: Dugong
 Dugong, Dugong dugon VU

Order: Chiroptera (bats) 

The bats' most distinguishing feature is that their forelimbs are developed as wings, making them the only mammals capable of flight. Bat species account for about 20% of all mammals.

Family: Pteropodidae (flying foxes, Old World fruit bats)
Subfamily: Pteropodinae
Genus: Pteropus
 Vanuatu flying fox, Pteropus anetianus LR/lc
 Banks flying fox, Pteropus fundatus VU
 Insular flying-fox, Pteropus tonganus LR/lc
 Pteropus, Pteropus vampyrus LR/lc
Subfamily: Macroglossinae
Genus: Notopteris
 Long-tailed fruit bat, Notopteris macdonaldi VU
Family: Vespertilionidae
Subfamily: Myotinae
Genus: Myotis
 Large-footed bat, Myotis adversus LR/lc
Subfamily: Miniopterinae
Genus: Miniopterus
 Little long-fingered bat, Miniopterus australis LR/lc
 Great bent-winged bat, Miniopterus tristis LR/lc
Family: Molossidae
Genus: Chaerephon
 Chaerephon bregullae LR/nt
 Northern freetail bat, Chaerephon jobensis LR/lc
Family: Emballonuridae
Genus: Emballonura
 Polynesian sheath-tailed bat, Emballonura semicaudata EN
Family: Rhinolophidae
Subfamily: Hipposiderinae
Genus: Aselliscus
 Temminck's trident bat, Aselliscus tricuspidatus LR/lc
Genus: Hipposideros
 Fawn roundleaf bat, Hipposideros cervinus LR/lc

Order: Cetacea (whales) 

The order Cetacea includes whales, dolphins and porpoises. They are the mammals most fully adapted to aquatic life with a spindle-shaped nearly hairless body, protected by a thick layer of blubber, and forelimbs and tail modified to provide propulsion underwater.

Suborder: Mysticeti
Family: Balaenopteridae
Subfamily: Megapterinae
Genus: Megaptera
 Humpback whale, Megaptera novaeangliae VU
Suborder: Odontoceti
Superfamily: Platanistoidea
Family: Ziphidae
Subfamily: Hyperoodontinae
Genus: Mesoplodon
 Blainville's beaked whale, Mesoplodon densirostris DD
 Ginkgo-toothed beaked whale, Mesoplodon ginkgodens DD
 Hector's beaked whale, Mesoplodon hectori DD
Family: Delphinidae (marine dolphins)
Genus: Stenella
 Pantropical spotted dolphin, Stenella attenuata LR/cd
 Striped dolphin, Stenella coeruleoalba LR/cd
 Spinner dolphin, Stenella longirostris LR/cd
Genus: Lagenodelphis
 Fraser's dolphin, Lagenodelphis hosei DD

See also
List of chordate orders
Lists of mammals by region
List of prehistoric mammals
Mammal classification
List of mammals described in the 2000s

Notes

References
 

 
Vanuatu
Mammals
Vanuatu